Shahriar Sadigh Afshar (born 1971) is an Iranian-American physicist and multiple award-winning inventor. He is known for devising and carrying out the Afshar experiment while at the private, Boston-based Institute for Radiation-Induced Mass Studies (IRIMS). The results were presented at a Harvard seminar in March 2004.

Biography
Since July 2004, Afshar has been a Visiting Research Professor in the Department of Physics and Astronomy at Rowan University. His highest academic degree is a Bachelor of Science He has numerous patents to his name in high-tech. In 2014 Afshar was ranked as the 8th smartest person alive by Super Scholar. He holds Iranian and American dual citizenship.

Afshar experiment 

The Afshar experiment is an optical experiment, which he claims demonstrates a contradiction of the principle of complementarity in quantum mechanics.  As a result of the controversy surrounding claims made about the experiment, Afshar complained that he had been attacked over his religion and ethnicity. These personal attacks drew a rebuke in an editorial in the New Scientist, which called them "extreme" and an "entirely wrong kind of conflict".

Business career 
More recently Afshar is President, CEO and CTO of Immerz Inc, a startup in Cambridge, Massachusetts, that makes the immersive media KOR-fx product. In his interviews with CNN and Bloomberg TV, it has been called "4D technology", as a follow on to the recent success of 3D entertainment.

Higgs Boson publicity 
On November 18, 2009, on the eve of Large Hadron Collider's launch, Afshar announced a wager in which he bet against LHC's finding the Higgs boson, also known as "the God particle," in a commentary in the New Scientist and in an award-winning article in Popular Science. He offered his own theory on the origin of inertia instead. With the announcement on July 4, 2012 by scientists at CERN that they had detected the Higgs boson Afshar appeared to have lost the bet. The evidence at the European Organization for Nuclear Research (CERN) suggests the existence of the Higgs, but few reputable physicists have called it completely dispositive as of January 2013. Rolf-Dieter Heuer, the director general of CERN, is among those withholding affirmation of this research. Dr. Heuer called the discovery "a historic milestone." However he and others said that it was too soon to know for sure, whether the new particle is the one predicted by the Standard Model, the theory that has ruled physics for the last half-century, and it will take further work to determine the accuracy.

References

External links
NPR interview NPR's Science Friday
American Physical Society News (Profiles in Versatility Interview)

Iranian expatriate academics
Iranian emigrants to the United States
21st-century American physicists
Experimental physicists
Living people
Harvard University alumni
Harvard University faculty
1971 births
Theoretical physicists
People from West Azerbaijan Province
Rowan University faculty
American chief executives of manufacturing companies
21st-century American inventors
Chief technology officers